Ronald Oscar Champagne (born 1942) is an American higher education administrator.  On August 25, 2010, he became the president of Roger Williams University on an interim basis.  Previously he served as president of Saint Xavier University from 1982 to 1994 and as interim president of Shimer College from 2007 to 2008 and Merrimack College from 2008 to 2010.  

Champagne was born in Rhode Island.  He holds a bachelor's degree from Duquesne University and master's degrees from Fordham University and Catholic University of America.  He earned his Ph.D. at Fordham in the foundations of mathematics and physics.  He was the first member of his family to attend college.

On February 29, 2012, Champagne was named interim president of Elmira College, effective July 1 of that year. In September 2015 Champagne stepped down from the interim president position at Elmira College. The college's trustees abruptly announced that Champagne would step down and would be succeeded by new interim president Norman Smith.

See also
History of Shimer College
List of Shimer College people

References

External links
Roger Williams University profile

Living people
Duquesne University alumni
Fordham University alumni
Catholic University of America alumni
Presidents of Shimer College
People from Rhode Island
1942 births
Presidents of Roger Williams University